Diego García Carrera (born 19 January 1996) is a male Spanish racewalker. He competed in the 20 kilometres walk event at the 2018 European Athletics Championships in Berlin, winning the silver medal.

In 2017, he won the gold medal in the men's 20 kilometres walk at the 2017 European Athletics U23 Championships held in Bydgoszcz, Poland.

He was also the winner of the IAAF Race Walking Challenge in 2018.

In 2019, he competed in the men's 20 kilometres walk at the 2019 World Athletics Championships held in Doha, Qatar. He finished in 35th place.

See also
 Spain at the 2015 World Championships in Athletics
 Spain at the 2018 European Athletics Championships

References

External links
 
 
 
 

Place of birth missing (living people)
1996 births
Living people
Spanish male racewalkers
World Athletics Championships athletes for Spain
European Championships (multi-sport event) silver medalists
European Athletics Championships medalists
Athletes (track and field) at the 2020 Summer Olympics
Olympic athletes of Spain